The discography of Bernard Fanning, an Australian singer-songwriter consists of four studio albums, and eleven singles.

Studio albums

Singles

Guest appearances

Notes

References

Discographies of Australian artists